Get It Got It is the second independent album by the rapper Lady Cam. It was released on May 20, 2014, by Southern Stisles Records and Altavoz Entertainment. The album was supported by the single "Get It Got It" and received positive reviews.

Track listing
Get It Started (The Party) – 3:36 
Holla – 4:19
Get It Got It – 3:13
Pocket Book – 3:30
Queen Of A Queen – 3:49
They Hate It – 4:00
Never Give Up – 4:42
Crush – 3:18
On The Fly – 3:03
My Story – 5:39

References

2014 albums
Lady Cam albums